Mohamed Sobhi may refer to:

 Mohamed Sobhi (actor), Egyptian actor
 Mohamed Sobhi (footballer), Egyptian footballer, born 1992
 Mohamed Sobhy (footballer, born 1981), Egyptian footballer (soccer)
 Mohamed Sobhy (footballer, born 1999), Egyptian footballer (soccer)